Jacbern (born 23 June 1992) is a Mexican American singer-songwriter.

Born in Monterrey, Mexico, Jacbern moved to San Antonio, Texas at a very young age. He then moved to Los Angeles with his twin brother Max, to form the June Junes. It was there that the June Junes released their single "She's the Latest One".

In late 2013 Jacbern was introduced to Dan Warner and went into the Studio with the Julca Brothers (Paulina Rubio) and who produced his new Spanish songs. He has also been busy writing with Cris Zalles (Ricky Martin, David Bisbal) and Carlos Perez Soto (Luis Fonsi, Ricky Martin).

In 2014 Jacbern co-wrote, with Cris Zalles and Sie7e, Sie7e's leading single off his new album "Tocando el Cielo".

References

American rock singers
Mexican rock musicians
1992 births
Living people
Musicians from Monterrey
American rock songwriters
21st-century American singers